Sergeant George Henry Doré (June 24, 1845 – February 8, 1927) was an English soldier who fought in the American Civil War. Doré received the United States' highest award for bravery during combat, the Medal of Honor, for his action during the Battle of Gettysburg in Pennsylvania on 3 July 1863. He was honored with the award on 1 December 1864.

Biography
Doré was born on the Isle of Wight in England on 24 June 1845. He enlisted into the 126th New York Infantry from West Bloomfield, New York on 22 August 1862. He was made prisoner following the Battle of Harpers Ferry, but paroled a day later. After his act of gallantry earned him the Medal of Honor on 3 July 1863 at the Battle of Gettysburg, he was promoted to corporal in December 1863 and sergeant in June 1864. He mustered out with his regiment on 3 June 1865.
Two other men of the 126th New York Infantry won the Medal of Honor for their actions at Gettysburg, Morris Brown, Jr. and Jerry Wall.

Doré died on 8 February 1927 and his remains are interred at the Rural Cemetery in Hornell, New York.

Medal of Honor citation

See also

List of Medal of Honor recipients for the Battle of Gettysburg
List of American Civil War Medal of Honor recipients: A–F

References

1845 births
1927 deaths
English-born Medal of Honor recipients
English emigrants to the United States
People of New York (state) in the American Civil War
Union Army officers
United States Army Medal of Honor recipients
American Civil War recipients of the Medal of Honor